Protobothrops cornutus, commonly known as the horned pit viper or Fan-Si-Pan horned pitviper, is a venomous pit viper species found in northern and central  Vietnam and in southern China (Guangdong). No subspecies are currently recognized.

Geographic range
The type locality given is "Fan-si-pan mountains, Tonkin, Indo-China" (=Mount Fansipan). It is currently known from several provinces in Vietnam (Lao Cai Province, Ha Giang Province, Quang Binh Province, Thua Thien-Hue Province, Lang Son Province). The only Chinese record is from Ruyuan Yao Autonomous County in northern Guangdong and was originally described as a new species, Ceratrimeresurus shenlii.

Habitat

Taxonomy
Herrmann et al. (2004) moved this species to the genus Protobothrops based on external and hemipenal morphology, as well as molecular data.

References

Further reading
Smith, M.A. 1930. Two new Snakes from Tonkin, Indo-China. Annals and Magazine of Natural History, Series 10, 6: 681-683.

cornutus
Snakes of China
Snakes of Vietnam
Reptiles described in 1930
Taxa named by Malcolm Arthur Smith
Taxonomy articles created by Polbot